Judith Salomé (born 10 February 1949) is a retired Dutch tennis player who won the Junior Wimbledon title in 1967. Between 1968 and 1970 she competed in singles and doubles in Grand Slam tournaments such as Wimbledon, Roland Garros, French Open and Australian Open, but was eliminated in the first round on most occasions.

After marrying Robert Lenting, she changed her last name to Lenting-Salomé.

References

External links

 
 

Dutch female tennis players
1949 births
Living people
Tennis players from Amsterdam
Grand Slam (tennis) champions in girls' singles
Wimbledon junior champions